Suicaine Gratifaction is the third solo album from former The Replacements leader Paul Westerberg.

Co-producer Don Was had admired Westerberg for years. He used Westerberg's solo debut, 14 Songs, as daily inspiration while producing the Rolling Stones' Voodoo Lounge. Westerberg once claimed that he had originally been interested in working with Quincy Jones.

Regarding the album's strange title, Westerberg said, "I don't want to think about it too deeply other than the fact that it seems wrong, and therefore it's attractive to me."

The piano solo in the middle of "Born for Me" is the subject of a chapter within Nick Hornby's Songbook, where its simply played, undemonstrative character, of a piece with the song as a whole, is contrasted with virtuosic solos that use the underlying song as a jumping-off point to some unrelated destination. Hornby describes Westerberg as a "born musician" and suggests that he's "a man who thinks and feels and loves and speaks in music." "Born for Me" was rerecorded with The I Don't Cares on the Wild Stab album.

Track listing
"It's a Wonderful Lie" – 2:47
"Self-Defense" – 3:15
"Best Thing That Never Happened" – 4:31
"Lookin' Out Forever" – 3:41
"Born for Me" – 4:00
"Final Hurrah" – 3:27
"Tears Rolling Up Our Sleeves" – 3:26
"Fugitive Kind" – 5:54
"Sunrise Always Listens" – 4:17
"Whatever Makes You Happy" – 3:15
"Actor in the Street" – 3:24
"Bookmark" – 3:11

Bonus Track Europe

“Wonderful Copenhagen”

Bonus Track Japan

“33rd of July" – 3:00

Personnel
Paul Westerberg – guitar, vocals
Shawn Colvin – vocals
Don Was – bass
Steve Ferrone – drums
Josh Freese – drums
Suzie Katayama – accordion, cello
Jim Keltner – drums, percussion
Abe Laboriel Jr. – drums
Greg Leisz – pedal steel guitar
Benmont Tench – keyboards
Richard Todd – French horn
Dave Pirner – backing vocals

References

1999 albums
Albums produced by Don Was
Paul Westerberg albums
Capitol Records albums
Albums produced by Paul Westerberg